Antribacter gilvus is a Gram-positive, aerobic and non-motile species from the family Promicromonosporaceae.

References

Monotypic bacteria genera
Micrococcales
Bacteria described in 2019